Hussam Ibrahim Ali Al-Sarray (born May 10, 1987 in Basra, Iraq), is an Iraqi footballer who plays as a striker.

International debut
On November 7, 2012 Hussam Ibrahim made his debut with Iraq against Qatar in not fully international match, scoring his first goal in the 90th minute of the game which ended 1-2 for Qatar.

On November 14, 2012 Hussam Ibrahim made his fully international debut against Jordan in the 2014 FIFA World Cup qualification as a starter, which ended 1-0 for Iraq.

International goals
Scores and results list Iraq's goal tally first.

Honors

International
Iraq National football team
 2012 WAFF Championship: runner-up
 21st Arabian Gulf Cup: runner-up

References

External links
Profile on Goalzz

1987 births
Living people
Sportspeople from Basra
Al-Mina'a SC players
Association football midfielders
Amanat Baghdad players
Iraqi footballers
Iraq international footballers
Al-Shorta SC players